Mildenhall may refer to:

Places in England
Mildenhall, Suffolk, town
RAF Mildenhall, air force station
The Mildenhall Treasure, Roman silver hoard
Mildenhall Town F.C.
Mildenhall, Wiltshire, village

People with the surname
Andrew Mildenhall (born 1966), English cricketer
Bill Mildenhall (born 1953), Australian basketball player and referee, and Australian rules football player
Bruce Mildenhall (born 1953), Australian politician
John Mildenhall (1560–1614), British explorer and adventurer, one of the first British travellers to make an overland journey to India
Neil Mildenhall (born 1968), Australian rules footballer
Steve Mildenhall (born 1979), English footballer
William James Mildenhall (1891–1962), early photographer of Canberra, Australia
The Mildenhall photographic collection, created by William James Mildenhall

Other
"Mildenhall", a song by American dream pop band The Shins from their 2017 album, Heartworms